"You Can Never Stop Me Loving You" is a song written by Ian Samwell and Jean Slater, and released in 1963 by Kenny Lynch.   Lynch's version spent 14 weeks on the UK's Record Retailer chart, reaching No. 10.

Johnny Tillotson recording
Later in 1963, Johnny Tillotson recorded the song. Tillotson's version spent 10 weeks on the Billboard Hot 100 chart peaking at No. 18, while reaching No. 4 on Billboards Middle-Road Singles chart, Outside the US, this version peaked at No. 1 in Germany, No. 3 in Israel, and No. 4 in Hong Kong.

Chart performance
Johnny Tillotson version

References

1963 songs
1963 singles
Johnny Tillotson songs
Songs written by Ian Samwell
Cadence Records singles
His Master's Voice singles
Number-one singles in Germany
Kenny Lynch songs